A list of films produced in the United Kingdom in 1951 (see 1951 in film):

1951

See also
 1951 in British music
 1951 in British television
 1951 in the United Kingdom

External links
 

1951
Films
British